In Riemannian geometry, Schur's lemma is a result that says, heuristically, whenever certain curvatures are pointwise constant then they are forced to be globally constant. The proof is essentially a one-step calculation, which has only one input: the second Bianchi identity.

The Schur lemma for the Ricci tensor 
Suppose  is a smooth Riemannian manifold with dimension  Recall that this defines for each element  of :
 the sectional curvature, which assigns to every 2-dimensional linear subspace  of  a real number 
 the Riemann curvature tensor, which is a multilinear map 
 the Ricci curvature, which is a symmetric bilinear map 
 the scalar curvature, which is a real number 
The Schur lemma states the following:

The Schur lemma is a simple consequence of the "twice-contracted second Bianchi identity," which states that

understood as an equality of smooth 1-forms on  Substituting in the given condition  one finds that

Alternative formulations of the assumptions
Let  be a symmetric bilinear form on an -dimensional inner product space  Then

Additionally, note that if  for some number  then one automatically has { With these observations in mind, one can restate the Schur lemma in the following form:

Note that the dimensional restriction is important, since every two-dimensional Riemannian manifold which does not have constant curvature would be a counterexample.

The Schur lemma for the Riemann tensor 
The following is an immediate corollary of the Schur lemma for the Ricci tensor.

The Schur lemma for Codazzi tensors 
Let  be a smooth Riemannian or pseudo-Riemannian manifold of dimension  Let  he a smooth symmetric (0,2)-tensor field whose covariant derivative, with respect to the Levi-Civita connection, is completely symmetric. The symmetry condition is an analogue of the Bianchi identity; continuing the analogy, one takes a trace to find that

If there is a function  on  such that  for all  in  then upon substitution one finds

Hence  implies that  is constant on each connected component of  As above, one can then state the Schur lemma in this context:

Applications 
The Schur lemmas are frequently employed to prove roundness of geometric objects. A noteworthy example is to characterize the limits of convergent geometric flows.

For example, a key part of Richard Hamilton's 1982 breakthrough on the Ricci flow was his "pinching estimate" which, informally stated, says that for a Riemannian metric which appears in a 3-manifold Ricci flow with positive Ricci curvature, the eigenvalues of the Ricci tensor are close to one another relative to the size of their sum. If one normalizes the sum, then, the eigenvalues are close to one another in an absolute sense. In this sense, each of the metrics appearing in a 3-manifold Ricci flow of positive Ricci curvature "approximately" satisfies the conditions of the Schur lemma. The Schur lemma itself is not explicitly applied, but its proof is effectively carried out through Hamilton's calculations.

In the same way, the Schur lemma for the Riemann tensor is employed to study convergence of Ricci flow in higher dimensions. This goes back to Gerhard Huisken's extension of Hamilton's work to higher dimensions, where the main part of the work is that the Weyl tensor and the semi-traceless Riemann tensor become zero in the long-time limit. This extends to the more general Ricci flow convergence theorems, some expositions of which directly use the Schur lemma. This includes the proof of the differentiable sphere theorem.

The Schur lemma for Codazzi tensors is employed directly in Huisken's foundational paper on convergence of mean curvature flow, which was modeled on Hamilton's work. In the final two sentences of Huisken's paper, it is concluded that one has a smooth embedding  with

The Schur lemma implies that the mean curvature is constant, and the image of this embedding then must be a standard round sphere.

Another application relates full isotropy and curvature. Suppose that  is a connected thrice-differentiable Riemannian manifold, and that for each  the group of isometries  acts transitively on  This means that for all  and all  there is an isometry  such that  and  This implies that  also acts transitively on  that is, for every  there is an isometry  such that  and  Since isometries preserve sectional curvature, this implies that  is constant for each  The Schur lemma implies that  has constant curvature. A particularly notable application of this is that any spacetime which models the cosmological principle must be the warped product of an interval and a constant-curvature Riemannian manifold. See O'Neill (1983, page 341).

Stability 
Recent research has investigated the case that the conditions of the Schur lemma are only approximately satisfied.

Consider the Schur lemma in the form "If the traceless Ricci tensor is zero then the scalar curvature is constant." Camillo De Lellis and Peter Topping have shown that if the traceless Ricci tensor is approximately zero then the scalar curvature is approximately constant. Precisely:
 Suppose  is a closed Riemannian manifold with nonnegative Ricci curvature and dimension  Then, where  denotes the average value of the scalar curvature, one has 

Next, consider the Schur lemma in the special form "If  is a connected embedded surface in  whose traceless second fundamental form is zero, then its mean curvature is constant." Camillo De Lellis and Stefan Müller have shown that if the traceless second fundamental form of a compact surface is approximately zero then the mean curvature is approximately constant. Precisely
As an application, one can conclude that  itself is 'close' to a round sphere.

References 

 Shoshichi Kobayashi and Katsumi Nomizu. Foundations of differential geometry. Vol. I. Interscience Publishers, a division of John Wiley & Sons, New York-London 1963 xi+329 pp.
 Barrett O'Neill. Semi-Riemannian geometry. With applications to relativity. Pure and Applied Mathematics, 103. Academic Press, Inc. [Harcourt Brace Jovanovich, Publishers], New York, 1983. xiii+468 pp. 

Riemannian geometry
Riemannian manifolds
Theorems in Riemannian geometry
Lemmas